Ardilistry is a settlement in Argyll and Bute, Scotland.

References

Hamlets in Argyll and Bute
Villages in Islay